Puji Bridge ((), may refer to:

 Puji Bridge (Shanghai), a historic stone arch bridge in the town of Jinze, Qingpu District, Shanghai, China.

 Puji Bridge (Suzhou), a historic stone arch bridge over the Shantang River in Suzhou, Jiangsu, China.

 Puji Bridge (Zunyi), a historic stone arch bridge over the Gaoqiao River in Zunyi, Guizhou, China.